Johan Hjalmar (John) Munsterhjelm (December 11, 1879 Tuulos – 16 August 1925 Helsinki) was a Finnish sculptor.

Biography

He was born to painter Magnus Hjalmar Munsterhjelm and Olga Mathilda Tanninen in Tuulos. He first aimed to become an architect while studying at Helsinki Polytechnical Institute, but he became more interested in applied arts. He studied at a kunstgewerbeschule in Berlin 1902–1903. He went onto further study at the Royal School of Art in Berlin. He ended up living in Berlin until 1911 while also making study tours in Scandinavia, Belgium, France and Italy. In 1909 he married German Hedvig Schneider. The same year he sculpted a bust of Jean Sibelius. He made decorative figurines out of bronze and granite, sculpted a city hall facade in Vaasa (showing Charles IX and the double portrait of the national rulers, Pehr Evind Svinhufvud and Gustaf Mannerheim), a large number of portrait busts of prominent persons and medallions.

He died following complications from appendix surgery in 1925. Being German-influenced and slightly foreign to Finland's sculpting circles at the time, he never developed a substantial reputation in Finland.

Works

References

1879 births
1925 deaths
20th-century Finnish sculptors